Alhambra/Ahlstrom Aerodrome  is located adjacent to Alhambra, Alberta, Canada.

References

Registered aerodromes in Alberta